Baycliff is a seaside village in the South Lakeland District of Cumbria in England. At the centre is a village green, and many of its buildings date from the 17th and 18th centuries. The two public houses, the Farmer's Arms and the Fisherman's Arms, stand close to the green.

History
In the past Baycliff, earlier spelt Baycliffe, was a fishing and farming community. The industries of iron mining and local white stone quarrying provided employment for the men of the village. The iron was shipped to Backbarrow.

The village was the birthplace in about 1619 of the prominent Quaker preachers Alice Curwen (maiden name unknown) and her husband Thomas Curwen.

Limestone
Baycliff limestone is still produced; the quarry beds produce two distinct stones. Lord is oatmeal coloured with dark cream markings; Caulfield is a buff stone with light coffee mottling. Both are versatile materials, used to create distinctive, durable floors and paving schemes, and in landscaping designs.

See also

Listed buildings in Aldingham

References

External links
 Cumbria County History Trust: Aldingham (nb: provisional research only – see Talk page)

Villages in Cumbria
Aldingham